The 2016 Utah Democratic presidential caucuses took place on March 22 in the U.S. state of Utah as one of the Democratic Party's primaries ahead of the 2016 presidential election.

On the same day, the Democratic Party held another caucus in Idaho and a primary in Arizona, while the Republican Party held primaries in two states, including their own Utah caucuses, plus in American Samoa.

Opinion polling

Results

Analysis
Sanders defeated Clinton by a landslide margin in Utah's caucus, winning almost 80 percent of the vote to Clinton's 20 percent. Sanders had held several rallies in Utah and spent $300,000 on TV advertising ahead of the state's caucuses, as well as those in Idaho and Arizona that were held on the same day. Though Clinton had been endorsed by some of the most prominent Democrats in Utah, such as then-Mayor of Salt Lake County Ben McAdams, she did not compete in the state as much as Sanders did. Turnout in the Utah caucus was unusually high, with some caucus sites needing to print extra ballots after running out multiple times. Sanders' victory in Utah was seen as part of a trend in which he tended to do better in whiter states and in those that held caucuses rather than primaries.

References

Utah
Democratic caucuses
2016
March 2016 events in the United States